Christoph Martin Vogtherr (born 1965) is a German art historian. He was director of the Wallace Collection. In January 2016 it was announced that Vogtherr would be leaving the Wallace Collection and would become director of the Hamburger Kunsthalle on 1 October 2016.

References

German art historians
1965 births
Living people
People associated with the Wallace Collection
Hamburg